The Pointsman is a 1986 Dutch film directed by Jos Stelling, starring Jim van der Woude, Stéphane Excoffier and John Kraaijkamp, Sr. It tells the story of a French woman who moves in with a Dutch railwayman at a remote railway station. The two are unable to converse, but soon begin a strange game of seduction. The film is based on the novel De wisselwachter by Jean-Paul Franssens.

Kraaijkamp was awarded the Golden Calf for Best Actor for his performance in the film.

Plot
A French woman gets off a train by mistake at a remote location. She tries to ask the pointsman for help, but the two do not understand each other's languages. She waits for another train to arrive, but it never happens.

She eventually moves in with the man at the station. Without being able to speak, the two begin to develop a relationship over the next few months.

Cast
 Jim van der Woude as the pointsman
 Stéphane Excoffier as the woman
 John Kraaijkamp, Sr. as the machinist
 Josse De Pauw as the mailman
 Ton van Dort as the machinist's assistant

Reception

Critical response
Janet Maslin of The New York Times described the film as "a mixture of strange, inchoate passions and even stranger Dutch humor, and there is little about it to capture the imagination. The characters and their actions are inscrutable, made even more so by the near-total absence of dialogue. The film's empty, mutable vistas (the exteriors were shot in Scotland) look good but evoke very little." Time Out London wrote: "Taking no account of plausibility, Stelling's exploration of the uses and abuses of power is art house fare, but neither obscure nor elitist. Enthralling performances generate a claustrophobic tension, but there's humour too."

Accolades

References

External links 
 
 

1986 drama films
1986 films
Dutch drama films
1980s Dutch-language films
Films based on Dutch novels
Films directed by Jos Stelling
Films set in Scotland
Films shot in Scotland
1980s French-language films
1986 multilingual films
Dutch multilingual films